La Albuera is a village southeast of Badajoz, Extremadura, Spain.  it had a population of c. 2,000 inhabitants.

History
It was scene of the Battle of Albuera (16 May 1811) between Spanish, Portuguese and British troops under  William Carr Beresford and the French ones led by Marshal Soult, in the course of  the Peninsular war.

Geography
Located south of the city of Badajoz and next to the Spanish borders with Portugal, La Albuera is, along with Guadiana del Caudillo, an enclave entirely surrounded by the municipal territory of Badajoz.

Twin towns
 Descartes, France

References

External links
 

Municipalities in the Province of Badajoz
Enclaves and exclaves